Lobna Abdel Aziz, aka Lobna Abdelaziz or Lobna Abd- el-aziz (born August 1, 1935) is an Egyptian actress.

Family 
Her father was Egyptian author Hamed Abdelaziz. In her early life she was married outside Egypt to the famous  rich Egyptian producer Ramsis Nagib. He divorced her later in Egypt against her will and his will although they were loving each other and happy together. She read news of her divorce in a journal before she was divorced. Ramsis Nagib kept his Christian religion  during marriage of Lobna  Abdelaziz by marrying her outside Egypt to overcome Egyptian laws which ban such marriage, this is proved by court's sentence.  After that she married  Ismael Barrada with whom she had two daughters.  Ismael died after more than 40 years of their marriage.

Selected filmography
 2011 Geddo Habibi = Grandpa My Darling
1967  Edrab El Shahhatin = Strike Of Beggars 
 1967 El Mokharrebun  = The Vandals 
 1967 El Eib = The Defect
 1965 Slalom (Italian) = Zigzag 
1963 Aroos El Nil = Bride of the Nile 
 1962 Ressalah min emraa maghoula= Letter from an Unknown Woman
 1962  Ah Men hawwa = Ah 0f Eve
 1961  Wa Islamah = Oh Islam
 1961 Gharam El Asyad = Masters Love
 1959  Ana Horra = I'm Free
 1957  El Wesadah El Khaliyah = The Empty Pillow

Television
 2007 Emaret Yakobyan (television series not movie)= Yakobyan Building

Theatre
 2010   Sokkar Hanem  (theatrical play not movie)=Lady Sugar

See also
 Top 100 Egyptian films
Egyptian films of the 1960s
 Lists of Egyptians

References

External links 
 

1935 births
Egyptian television actresses
20th-century Egyptian actresses
Egyptian film actresses
Living people
Actresses from Cairo